This is a list of the people who have served in the office of Lord Lieutenant of Dyfed, as created on 1 April 1974 in replacement of the former offices of  Lord Lieutenant of Cardiganshire, Lord Lieutenant of Carmarthenshire, and Lord Lieutenant of Pembrokeshire.

The Hon. Richard Hanning Philipps (former Lord Lieutenant of Pembrokeshire) 1 April 1974 – 15 February 1979, assisted by two lieutenants:
John Hext Lewes (former Lord Lieutenant of Cardiganshire)
Sir David Courtenay Mansel Lewis (former Lord Lieutenant of Carmarthenshire)
Sir David Courtenay Mansel Lewis 15 February 1979 – 16 December 2002 
John Morris, Baron Morris of Aberavon 16 December 2002 – 5 November 2006 
The Hon. Robin William Lewis 17 September 2007 – 6 February 2016 
Sara Edwards 7 February 2016 – Present

References
The Lord-Lieutenants Order (1973/1754)

1974 establishments in Wales
Dyfed
Dyfed